Loepa formosensis is a species of moth in the family Saturniidae. It is found in Taiwan.

References

Moths described in 1938
Saturniinae